Chaotianmen  is a station on Line 1 of Chongqing Rail Transit in Chongqing Municipality, China. It is located in Yuzhong District and opened on 31 December 2020.

Station structure
There are an island platform and two side platforms at this station, which adopts the Spanish solution to separate boarding and alighting passengers.

References

Chongqing Rail Transit stations